Tom Eisenhuth (born 17 July 1992) is an Australian professional rugby league footballer who plays as a  forward for the Melbourne Storm in the NRL. 

Early life
Eisenhuth was born in the Blue Mountains, New South Wales and was educated at St Columba's College, Springwood. 

He played his junior football for the Lower Mountains Eagles before being signed by the Penrith Panthers. He played for the Panthers' NYC team from 2010 to 2012, scoring 8 tries in 47 games.

Playing career

Penrith Panthers
In Round 24 of the 2012 NRL season, Eisenhuth made his NRL debut for the Panthers in their 18-16 win over the New Zealand Warriors at Mt Smart Stadium.

In 2013, Eisenhuth moved into Penrith's NSW Cup side, the Windsor Wolves. Between 2014 and 2018, Eisenhuth played 44 matches for Penrith's self-named New South Wales Cup team, scoring 18 tries. In 2016, Eisenhuth played for the St Marys Saints in their Ron Massey Cup Grand Final loss. On 26 June 2018, Eisenhuth was released from his contract with Penrith effective immediately. He then signed with the Melbourne Storm for the remainder of the 2018 season.

Melbourne Storm
In Round 1 of the 2019 NRL season, Eisenhuth made his Melbourne Storm debut against the Brisbane Broncos at AAMI Park. He had his Melbourne jersey (cap number 192) presented to him by former Melbourne player Ryan Hoffman.  Eisenhuth played a total of 17 games for Melbourne in the 2021 NRL season as the club won 19 matches in a row and claimed the Minor Premiership.  Eisenhuth did not play in the club's finals series where Melbourne suffered a 10-6 loss against eventual premiers Penrith in the preliminary final.

In 2022, Eisenhuth was named in the NRL and Rugby League Players Association academic team of the year. A qualified schoolteacher, Eisenhuth balanced his rugby league commitments with completing a Masters of Education through the Australian Catholic University.

Representative career
Eisenhuth has played for the New South Wales Under 18's team.

On 2 October 2012, Eisenhuth was named on the bench in the Junior Kangaroos team to face the Junior Kiwis.

References

External links
Melbourne Storm profile
Penrith Panthers profile

1992 births
Living people
Penrith Panthers players
Rugby league centres
Rugby league second-rows
Australian rugby league players
Junior Kangaroos players
Windsor Wolves players
Rugby league players from New South Wales
Melbourne Storm players
Sunshine Coast Falcons players